Lee Il-hee (born 30 October 1961) is a South Korean fencer. He competed in the individual and team épée events at the 1984 and 1988 Summer Olympics.

References

External links
 

1961 births
Living people
South Korean male épée fencers
Olympic fencers of South Korea
Fencers at the 1984 Summer Olympics
Fencers at the 1988 Summer Olympics
Asian Games medalists in fencing
Fencers at the 1986 Asian Games
Asian Games gold medalists for South Korea
Medalists at the 1986 Asian Games